Vytautas Šulskis (born August 8, 1988) is a Lithuanian professional basketball player.

High school
Born in Vilnius, Šulskis attended The Rock of Gainesville High School in Gainesville, Florida, where he played soccer and basketball. During his high school off-season Šulskis played AAU basketball for Florida Elite out of Tampa, Florida. Šulskis was teammates with a number of highly regarded basketball players including Larry Sanders, Justin Morin, and Dominque Jones while playing AAU for the Elite.

College career
After graduation from high school, Šulskis went on to play for the Youngstown State University Penguins of NCAA. While playing for Penguins, Šulskis scored more than 1,000 career points and starred in 120 consecutive games. He averaged 13.1 points per game, 5.2 rebounds per game and 2 assists per game his senior year.

Professional career
In August 2011, he signed a one-year contract with BC Žalgiris of Lithuania. However, he ended up not playing there and moving to BC Nevėžis. In 2012, Šulskis signed with BC Šiauliai. From 2015 he is playing for Vytautas Prienai-Birštonas. In the 2015–16 season, Šulskis was named the Most Valuable Player of the LKL.

In December 2017, Šulskis returned to Lithuania and signed with BC Neptūnas.

References

External links
Eurobasket.com Profile

1988 births
Living people
BC Juventus players
BC Neptūnas players
BC Nevėžis players
BC Pieno žvaigždės players
BC Prienai players
BC Šiauliai players
Lithuanian men's basketball players
Lithuanian expatriate basketball people in the United States
Shooting guards
Small forwards
Basketball players from Vilnius
Youngstown State Penguins men's basketball players